Vasily Yan (Russian: Васи́лий Ян; 23 December 1874 (4 January 1875), Kyiv, Russian Empire – August 5, 1954, Zvenigorod, Moscow Oblast) was a Russian writer, author of famous historic novels. Also spelled "Vassily Yan" (or "Ian") or just "V. Yan", this is the pen name of Vassily Grigoryevich Yanchevetsky (Васи́лий Григо́рьевич Янчеве́цкий).

Biography
Born in Kyiv to a family of teachers, his father was from an Orthodox Christian priests family, who graduated from seminary and taught Latin and Greek at the University Gymnasium.

In 1897, Yan graduated from the historical and philological faculty of St. Petersburg University. Impressions of a two-year tour of Russia form the backbone of his book Notes of a Pedestrian (1901). In 1901–1904 he served as inspector of wells in Turkestan, where he studied Oriental languages and lives of local people. During the Russian-Japanese war, he was a military correspondent for the St. Petersburg News Agency (SPA). In 1906–1913, he taught Latin at the first Petersburg Gymnasium. As an organizer of the scouts he met with Colonel Robert Baden-Powell, who came to Russia in 1910.

In the autumn of 1910 Vasily Yan introduced the magazine Pupil. In 1913, he worked as a correspondent in Turkey SPA. In 1914, with the beginning of the First World War - he became SPA military correspondent in Romania. In 1918–1919 he worked in the Kolchak printing shop army camp in Siberia. After the restoration of Soviet power in Achinsk he worked as a teacher, correspondent and director of schools in Uryanhae (Tuva). He then became the editor of the leading newspaper The Power of labour in Minusinsk. That was when he first adopted the pseudonym Yan. In 1923, he moved to Moscow.

Works by Vasily Yan 
"Notes of a Pedestrian", 1901
story "Story of Captain", 1907
story "Soul", 1910
"Raising of the Übermensch", 1910
"What You Need to do for the Children of St. Petersburg", 1911
novel "The Afghan Emerald"
story "Phoenician Ship", 1931
story "The Lights at Barrows", 1932
story "Spartacus", 1933
story "Hammermen", 1933
Mongol invasion (trilogy):
story "Genghis Khan", 1939 (the USSR State Prize in 1942)
story "Baty", 1942
story "To Last Sea", published 1955
"Kids Commander"
"The Mystery of Lake Kara-Standard"
"Yermak's Campaign"
"On the Wings of Courage"
"Melters of the Vandzh"
"In the Sands of the Karakum"

Falsification of the novel "Ermak's Campaign" was carried out in 2011 by "Leningrad publishing house" (ЛЕНИЗДАТ). In fact this novel is Lydia Charskaya's "Formidable squad" (Грозная дружина) published in 1909. The circulation of the fake "Lenizdat" was only 7050 copies. Since the falsification was successful, it is referred to as the real work of Vasily Yan.

References

External links

Writers from the Russian Empire
Stalin Prize winners
1875 births
1954 deaths
Writers from Kyiv
Burials at Vagankovo Cemetery
Soviet writers